This is a list of fictional towns in literature.

References

Fictional towns
Literature